The Lewis Loom Centre is located in Stornoway, Lewis, in Scotland

Buildings and structures in the Isle of Lewis
Tourist attractions in the Outer Hebrides
Weaving
Stornoway